Çukurpinar (former Küçüksevin) is a village in Kahramanmaras Province,  Afşin District Turkey.

The local culture is traditional Turkish culture and the population in  2000 was 296. The climate of the village is predominantly continental climate as the village is near the Mediterranean Sea. 
The village economy is agriculture and animal husbandry is based. The village elects a headman, the most recent of which was Halil Kiraz.

The village has a primary school, electricity and fixed telephone and town drinking water but no sewage, post office nor medical facilities.

References

Villages in Kahramanmaraş Province
Afşin (district)